Prince Ferdinando of Savoy, 3rd Duke of Genoa (Ferdinando Umberto Filippo Adalberto; 21 April 1884 – 24 June 1963) was the third Duke of Genoa and a member of the House of Savoy. He was an admiral in the Royal Italian Navy.

Early life
Prince Ferdinando was born in Turin the eldest son of Prince Thomas of Savoy, Duke of Genoa (1854-1931) and his wife Princess Isabella of Bavaria (1863–1924). On 22 September 1904 he was given the title Prince of Udine.

Ferdinado pursued a career in the Italian Royal Navy. Holding the rank of Captain he served in World War I commanding a Torpedo Boat Destroyer and was decorated with a medal of honour for personal bravery.

In May 1917 with War raging in Europe, Prince Ferdinando was appointed to lead an Italian War Commission to the United States of America. The commission which included Guglielmo Marconi and leading Italian political and commercial figures, visited America with the task of discussing financial and trade agreements and increasing co-operation between the two nations to help the Italian war effort.

Post war
In the autumn of 1927 Mussolini despatched the Prince of Udine to Tangier, Morocco in command of a naval squadron of three warships to demonstrate Italy’s interest in the city. In November 1930 he represented his cousin King Victor Emmanuel III at the coronation of Emperor Haile Selassie I of Ethiopia. Prince Ferdinando succeeded to the title Duke of Genoa on 15 April 1931 following the death of his father.

Later on in his naval career Prince Ferdinando achieved the rank of admiral, and become commander of the upper Adriatic sea.

He married in Turin on 28 February 1938, Maria Luisa Alliaga Gandolfi dei conti di Ricaldone (11 October 1899 in Fossano – 19 July 1986 in Turin), an Italian noblewoman. Maria Luisa was a daughter of Carlo Gandolfi di Ricaldone, Count of Borghetto, Montegrosso and Pornassio, and Emma Teresa Luisa Cavalli. They had no children.

The reign of the House of Savoy in Italy came to end on 12 June 1946 after a referendum was held and the Italian people voted to abolish the monarchy.

With his death in Bordighera without children, his brother Prince Filiberto succeeded to the title Duke of Genoa.

Ancestry

References

1884 births
1963 deaths
Nobility from Turin
Dukes of Genoa
Italian princes
Italian admirals
Burials at the Basilica of Superga
Italian military personnel of World War I
Regia Marina personnel of World War II
Honorary Knights Grand Cross of the Royal Victorian Order
Military personnel from Turin